Bartosz Huzarski (born 27 October 1980 in Świdnica) is a Polish former professional road bicycle racer, who competed professionally between 2002 and 2016 for the ,  and  teams.

Major results

2003
 Peace Race
1st Young rider classification
1st Stage 7
 2nd Overall Tour of Małopolska
2005
 1st Mountains classification Tour de Pologne
 2nd Overall Tour of Małopolska
 2nd Time trial, National Road Championships
 6th Overall Bałtyk–Karkonosze Tour
1st Stage 6
 8th Rund um die Hainleite
 10th Overall Giro del Capo
2006
 1st  Mountains classification Tour de Pologne
 5th Overall Szlakiem Grodów Piastowskich
 8th Szlakiem Walk Majora Hubala
2007
 3rd Overall Szlakiem Grodów Piastowskich
 8th Overall Tour du Poitou Charentes et de la Vienne
 10th Coupe des Carpathes
2008
 1st  Overall Szlakiem Grodów Piastowskich
1st Stage 1
 1st GP Dzierzoniowa
 1st Szosami Zagłębia
2009
 2nd Time trial, National Road Championships
 6th Overall Course de Solidarność et des Champions Olympiques
2010
 1st Stage 5 Settimana Internazionale di Coppi e Bartali
 1st Stage 1 Settimana Ciclistica Lombarda
 2nd Overall Szlakiem Grodów Piastowskich
 5th Overall Brixia Tour
1st Stage 1 (TTT)
 9th Gran Premio Nobili Rubinetterie
2011
 6th Overall Tour of Turkey
 7th Overall Tour de Pologne
2012
 2nd Overall Settimana Internazionale di Coppi e Bartali
1st Stage 2b (TTT)
 2nd Overall Course de Solidarność et des Champions Olympiques
1st Stage 5 
 5th Overall Tour of Britain
 8th Druivenkoers Overijse
 9th Overall Vuelta a Murcia
2013
 1st  Sprints classification Tour de Pologne
 5th Overall Szlakiem Grodów Piastowskich
2014 
 7th Overall USA Pro Cycling Challenge
2015
 1st Stage 1 (TTT) Giro del Trentino
 3rd Time trial, National Road Championships
  Combativity award Stage 8 Tour de France

Grand Tour general classification results timeline

References

External links 

1980 births
Living people
People from Świdnica
Polish male cyclists
Sportspeople from Lower Silesian Voivodeship
20th-century Polish people
21st-century Polish people